Duchcov is the name of a grand house in the town of Duchcov, located about 8 km from Litvínov, in northern Bohemia, Czech Republic. The château houses a museum with a collection of historic furniture. Also on display is the painting and portrait gallery of the Waldsteins, including portraits of the most famous member of this family, Albrecht von Wallenstein, Duke of Friedland, by Anthony van Dyck. One room is dedicated to Giacomo Casanova, who was employed here as a librarian from 1785 to 1798, and his memoirs Histoire de ma vie were written here in the years before his death in 1798.

History

The château was founded as a fort in the 13th century by the Hrabišic family, which resided at the Osek Castle. Not earlier than 1527, the Lobkowicz family replaced the fort with a one-wing Renaissance palace. Marie Polyxena of Thalmberg, the widow of František Josef of Lobkowicz, married secondly Maximillian, Count of Waldstein in 1642. Their son Jan Bedřich, Count of Waldstein, later the Archbishop of Prague, was apprised with the French architect and painter Jean Baptiste Mathey, and he brought him to Duchcov for the purpose of rebuilding the residence. The château was incorporated in the Waldstein's family fideicommis and passed on through inheritance to Ernst Joseph Count Waldstein and to his descendants until it was nationalised in 1945.

Mathey designed a huge Baroque complex, including a large park and a hospital. The decoration of the building was provided by the best Baroque artists in Bohemia, like the sculptors Matyáš Bernard Braun, Ferdinand Maxmilián Brokoff, and painter Václav Vavřinec Reiner. Between 1785 and 1798, Giacomo Casanova, the so-called secretary of the 18th century, spent the last thirteen years of his amazing life in Duchcov.

In the 19th century, the château was rebuilt in the classicist style and the garden in the romantic style. The Waldstein family left the place in 1921. At present, the château is state-owned and open to visitors. The garden grounds serve as a public park.

See also
 House of Lobkowicz
 House of Waldstein
 List of castles in the Ústí nad Labem Region

References

External links

 Castle of Dux, aerial photo
 Usti Region Official site

Dux
Castles in the Czech Republic
Castles in the Ústí nad Labem Region
National Cultural Monuments of the Czech Republic
Museums in the Ústí nad Labem Region